"We Believe in Happy Endings" is a song written by Bob McDill and recorded by American country music artist Johnny Rodriguez.  It was released in September 1978 as the second single from the album Just for You.  The single went to number seven on the Billboard Hot Country Singles & Tracks chart.

Johnny Rodriguez version

Chart performance

Earl Thomas Conley with Emmylou Harris version

The song was also recorded by American country music artist Earl Thomas Conley with Emmylou Harris as a duet. It was released in June 1988 as the second single from Conley's album The Heart of It All. The song was the only collaboration of Conley and Harris to make the country chart.  The single went to number one for one week on the country chart and spent a total of fifteen weeks on the chart. Their performance earned Harris and Conley a nomination for the Grammy Award for Best Country Collaboration with Vocals. It's was also Harris's final country number one.

Chart performance
"We Believe in Happy Endings" debuted on the U.S. Billboard Hot Country Singles for the week of July 2, 1988.

Weekly charts

Year-end charts

References
 
 

1978 singles
1988 singles
Johnny Rodriguez songs
Earl Thomas Conley songs
Emmylou Harris songs
Songs written by Bob McDill
Song recordings produced by Emory Gordy Jr.
Male–female vocal duets
Mercury Records singles
RCA Records singles
1978 songs